is a Japanese footballer currently playing as a defender for Giravanz Kitakyushu, on loan from JEF United Chiba.

Career statistics

Club
.

Notes

References

External links

1997 births
Living people
Association football people from Tokyo
Ryutsu Keizai University alumni
Japanese footballers
Association football defenders
J2 League players
JEF United Chiba players
Giravanz Kitakyushu players